The Multan cricket team was a first-class cricket team based in Multan, Punjab, Pakistan. Their home ground was the Multan Cricket Stadium. They participated in the Quaid-e-Azam Trophy. For List A and Twenty20 cricket the team were known as the Multan Tigers and they participate in the various Pakistan List A competitions and in the Faysal Bank T20 Cup.

They have played first-class cricket in most seasons since 1958-59. At the end of 2013 they had played 205 first-class matches, with 40 wins, 89 losses and 76 draws. Their highest individual score is 225 by Aamer Yamin against Quetta in 2013-14. Their best innings bowling figures are 10 for 143 by Zulfiqar Babar against Islamabad in 2009-10.

References

External links
 Multan at CricketArchive

Sport in Punjab, Pakistan
Pakistani first-class cricket teams